Outram  is a planning area located within the Central Area of the Central Region of Singapore. The area is bordered by these planning areas: Singapore River to the north, the Downtown Core to the east and south, and Bukit Merah to the west.

Outram is home to several key municipal buildings, such as Singapore General Hospital (SGH) and several other specialist health centres operated by Singapore Health Services (SingHealth) as well as the Central Narcotics Bureau and the Police Cantonment Complex. Outram Secondary School is situated in nearby York Hill. Across the Outram Road from the Outram Park MRT station is the Health Sciences Authority building. Along the same side of the road further down towards College Road, is Block 9 where Mortuary@HSA is located. At the junction of Outram Road and College Road stands the Alumni Building which at one time housed the Department of Scientific Services (DSS) before it was relocated to its present location in HSA Building.

Etymology
Outram Road was named by the Municipality in 1858 after a British general, Sir James Outram (1803–1863), of the Indian rebellion of 1857 fame. The nearby Havelock Road was named in reference to Major-General Sir Henry Havelock. General Outram and General Havelock were two of the leaders in the British army during the Indian rebellion of 1857.

History 
Known as si pai poh in Hokkien, it means "Sepoy plain". The Sepoy Lines and police station and parade ground are at one end of Outram Road. Both designations of Sepoy Plain and Sepoy Lines refer to the public shooting of 47 sepoys at the wall of Outram Prison in 1915. This was in the aftermath of the 1915 Singapore Mutiny which was quelled by local and British military forces.

References

Victor R Savage, Brenda S A Yeoh (2003), Toponymics - A Study of Singapore Street Names, Eastern Universities Press, 

 
Places in Singapore